Brumimicrobium glaciale is a bacterium. It is gliding, rod-like and facultatively anaerobic with a fermentative metabolism.

References

Further reading
Staley, James T., et al. "Bergey's manual of systematic bacteriology, vol. 4. "Williams and Wilkins, Baltimore, MD (1989): 2250–2251.

External links
LPSN
WORMS
Type strain of Brumimicrobium glaciale at BacDive -  the Bacterial Diversity Metadatabase

Sphingobacteriia
Bacteria described in 2003